Rodney Lee Horn (born November 23, 1956) is a former American football defensive tackle in the National Football League (NFL). He was drafted by the Cincinnati Bengals in the 3rd round of the 1980 NFL Draft. Horn played college football at Nebraska.

References

Cincinnati Bengals players
American football defensive tackles
Nebraska Cornhuskers football players
Sportspeople from Fresno, California
1956 births
Living people